Eupithecia arenitincta is a moth in the  family Geometridae. It is found in Algeria.

References

Moths described in 1938
arenitincta
Moths of Africa